Kerry McCoy may refer to:
Kerry McCoy (wrestler) (born 1974), American amateur wrestler
Kerry McCoy (musician) (born 1988), American musician and songwriter